Yara Goubran (in Arabic يارا جبران), is an Egyptian film and stage actress very famous for her roles in independent Egyptian theatre as well as her lead role in an award-winning film Basra in the role of Nahla.

Goubran graduated from the American University of Cairo where she had studied media and theater. In addition to Basra, she has appeared in the Egyptian film Karim's Harem (Hareem Kareem) and Farsh w ghata and Egyptian television series Lahazaat hariga and Arfat al bahr.

Filmography
2005: Malek wa ketaba
2005: Karim's Harem
2007: Winter's Day Visits (short)
2008: The Aquarium as Nihad Aboul Enein 
2009: Basra as Nahla
2010: 678 as Amina
2013: Rags & Tatters

References

External links

Egyptian film actresses
Egyptian television actresses
Egyptian stage actresses
Living people
21st-century Egyptian actresses
1982 births
The American University in Cairo alumni
Place of birth missing (living people)